The Holy Burial Chapel  is a  chapel in the Belgian municipality Eeklo. The chapel is situated near The Cemetery of Eeklo.

The chapel, single-aisled and made of bricks and natural stone, was built in 1898, under supervision of the city architect Frans van Wassenove. There are various terracotta statues, of which the topmost represents the Archangel Michael . The statues, designed by Fernand Nisol, were restored by students of the Provincial Institute of Eeklo, in 2004

History 
The chapel is built on the location of a Calvary Hill  with a dug-in scene of the Holy Grave, and a crucifix. There used to be a Holy Grave in 1775, which was moved in 1780, to make space for the construction of a mill. In 1794, during the reign of the French Revolutionaries, the Holy grave and the Crucifix disappeared. In 1808-1809, a new Holy Grave was constructed. The Calvary Hill was excavated in 1898, during the deconstruction of the mill. Pastor-deacon Camillus Hulpiau (1896-1910) took the initiative to build the current chapel.

Prominent in the chapel, is the polychrome sculpture group of the entombment by Mathias Zens. A Calvary Hill with a Crucifix, Mary, and John on a rock, originates from the former Calvary Hill.

Gallery

Source 

 Infofiche van Onroerend Erfgoed België

Protected Monuments of Culture